The Breeders' Cup Filly & Mare Turf is a Weight for Age Thoroughbred horse race on turf for fillies and mares, three years old and up. It is held annually at a different racetrack in the United States as part of the Breeders' Cup World Championships.

For tracks which can accommodate either distance (Belmont, Woodbine, and Santa Anita ), it is run at  miles. The 2015 edition at Keeneland was conducted at  miles because that track's turf course configuration does not allow for the two regular distances to be conducted on it. For the same reason, the 2017 edition at Del Mar was held at a distance of  miles.

Automatic Berths 
Beginning in 2007, the Breeders' Cup developed the Breeders' Cup Challenge, a series of races in each division that allotted automatic qualifying bids to winners of defined races. Each of the fourteen divisions has multiple qualifying races. Note though that one horse may win multiple challenge races, while other challenge winners will not be entered in the Breeders' Cup for a variety of reasons such as injury or travel considerations.

In the Filly & Mare Turf division, runners are limited to 14 and there are up to nine automatic berths. The 2022 "Win and You're In" races were:
 the Paddock Stakes, a Group 1 race run in January at Kenilworth race course in South Africa
 the Victoria Mile, a Grade 1 race run in May at Tokyo Racecourse in Japan
 the Gran Premio Pamplona, a Group 1 run in June at Hipódromo de Monterrico in Peru 
 the Beverly D. Stakes, a Grade 1 race run in August at Churchill Downs in Kentucky
 the Yorkshire Oaks, a Group 1 race run in August at York Racecourse in England
 the Flower Bowl Invitational Stakes, a Grade 1 race at Saratoga Race Course in New York
 the Matron Stakes, a Group 1 race run in September at Leopardstown in Ireland 
 the Rodeo Drive Stakes, a Grade 1 race run in October at Santa Anita Park in California
 the Prix de l'Opéra, a Group 1 race run in October at Longchamp Racecourse in Paris, France

Records
Most wins:
 Ouija Board (2004, 2006)

Most wins by a jockey:
 3 – John R. Velazquez (2002, 2011, 2018)

Most wins by a trainer:
 4 – Chad C. Brown (2012, 2014, 2015, 2018)

Most wins by an owner:
 3 – Juddmonte Farms (2001, 2005, 2009)
 2 – Lord Derby (2004, 2006)

Winners of the Breeders' Cup Filly & Mare Turf since 1999

See also 

 Breeders' Cup Filly & Mare Turf "top three finishers" and starters
 Breeders' Cup World Thoroughbred Championships
 American thoroughbred racing top attended events

References 

Racing Post:

External links
Official Breeders' Cup website

Filly and Mare Turf
Middle distance horse races for fillies and mares
Grade 1 turf stakes races in the United States
Horse races in the United States
Graded stakes races in the United States
Turf races in the United States
Recurring sporting events established in 1999
1999 establishments in the United States